The New England Foundation for the Arts (NEFA), headquartered in Boston, Massachusetts, is one of six not-for-profit regional arts organizations funded by the National Endowment for the Arts (NEA) and by private foundations, corporations and individuals. 

Founded in 1976, NEFA functions as a grantmaker, program initiator, regional laboratory, project coordinator, developer of resources, and builder of creative partnerships among artists, arts organizations, and funders. The Foundation serves the state arts councils of Connecticut, Maine, Massachusetts, New Hampshire, Rhode Island, and Vermont, which comprise New England.  NEFA also has national programs in contemporary dance and theater and administers Center Stage, an international arts exchange program in partnership with the U.S. Department of State.

See also
 Culture of the United States
 Culture of New England

External links
New England Foundation for the Arts 
US Regional Arts Organizations

References

Arts foundations based in the United States
Arts organizations based in Massachusetts
Culture of New England
Non-profit organizations based in Boston
Arts organizations established in 1976
1976 establishments in Massachusetts